Thomas A. Hendricks Library, also known as Hendricks Hall, is a historic library building located on the campus of Hanover College at Hanover Township, Jefferson County, Indiana. It was designed by the architectural firm Patton & Miller and built in 1903.  It is a two-story, rectangular, Colonial Revival style brick and limestone building.  It measures 48 feet by 75 feet and has a projecting entrance bay with Ionic order stone pilasters.  It features a low dome sheathed in copper and Palladian windows.  It is named for Hanover College graduate, Indiana governor, and Vice President Thomas A. Hendricks.

It was listed on the National Register of Historic Places in 1982.

References

University and college buildings on the National Register of Historic Places in Indiana
Libraries on the National Register of Historic Places in Indiana
Colonial Revival architecture in Indiana
Library buildings completed in 1903
Buildings and structures in Jefferson County, Indiana
National Register of Historic Places in Jefferson County, Indiana